The Eastern Open Invitational, first played as the Eastern Open, was a golf tournament on the PGA Tour that was played in Maryland in the 1950s and early 1960s. The first nine events were played at Mt. Pleasant Municipal Golf Club in Baltimore, an 18-hole par-71 public course designed by Gus Hook and opened in 1933. For the next three years beginning with the 1959 event, the tournament moved to the new Pine Ridge Golf Club in Lutherville, three miles north of downtown Towson. This course, which overlooks the Loch Raven Reservoir, was built by Gus Hook in 1958. The tournament moved back to Mt. Pleasant after the 1961 event.

Winners

References

Former PGA Tour events
Golf in Maryland
Sports competitions in Baltimore
1950 establishments in Maryland
Recurring sporting events established in 1950
Recurring sporting events disestablished in 1962